The Widow of Bath is a crime thriller novel by the Scottish author Margot Bennett, published in 1952.

Premise
Hugh Everton, who is struggling to readjust to normal life  after serving several months in prison, re-encounters his ex-lover, the vivacious Lucy, who is married to the staid Judge Bath. Against his better judgement, Hugh agrees to spend some time at their house, but before long, the judge is killed and his body vanishes.

TV Serial

The book was adapted into a six-episode serial by the BBC in 1959, which was directed by Gerard Glaister, with the screenplay written by Bennett herself. It starred John Justin as Hugh Everton and Barbara Murray as Lucy. It no longer survives in the BBC archives.

Availability
The novel is no longer in print. It was last issued in 2001. As at September 2021 it can be purchased as an e-book from Amazon UK.

References

1952 British novels
British thriller novels
British crime novels
Novels by Margot Bennett
Novels set in England
Novels set in London
Eyre & Spottiswoode books
British novels adapted into television shows